Bonhoeffer is a surname. Notable people with the surname include:

Dietrich Bonhoeffer (1906-1945), German pastor, theologian, spy, anti-Nazi dissident, and key founding member of the Confessing Church
Karl Bonhoeffer (1868-1948), German neuroscientist and physician
Klaus Bonhoeffer (1901-1945), German jurist and resistance fighter against the Nazi régime who was executed after the July 1944 plot to kill Hitler
Emmi Bonhoeffer, wife of anti-Hitler activist Klaus Bonhoeffer
Tobias Bonhoeffer (born 1960), German neurobiologist

See also
Bonhoeffer family, a German family originally descending from Nijmegen
Bonhoeffer Botanical Gardens, botanical garden north of Seattle on the premises of the Freeborn Lutheran Church. They are named in honor of Dietrich Bonhoeffer, a Lutheran pastor and scholar, who was executed in April, 1945, in Nazi Germany's Flossenburg concentration camp
Bonhoeffer-van der Pol model named after Karl Friedrich Bonhoeffer and Balthasar van der Pol. Now known as FitzHugh–Nagumo model